Ashurabad (also Romanized as Āshūrābād, ‘Ashīrābād, and Ashorabād) is a village in Japelaq-e Gharbi Rural District, Japelaq District, Azna County, Lorestan Province, Iran. At the 2006 census, its population was 881, in 220 families.

References 

Towns and villages in Azna County